J.C. Black House is a historic home located at Carthage, Moore County, North Carolina. It was built in 1893, and is a large two-story, rectangular Queen Anne style frame dwelling.  It sits on a brick foundation and has a hipped roof.  It features a three-story, polygonal corner tower, recessed balcony, round two-story bay, and a front porch with decorative sawnwork, turned brackets, and a spindle frieze.  Also on the property is a contributing fanciful, polygonal well house.

It was added to the National Register of Historic Places in 1999.

References

Houses on the National Register of Historic Places in North Carolina
Queen Anne architecture in North Carolina
Houses completed in 1893
Houses in Moore County, North Carolina
National Register of Historic Places in Moore County, North Carolina